Cuttack Lok Sabha Constituency is one of the 21 Lok Sabha (Parliamentary) Constituencies in Odisha state in Eastern India.

Assembly Segments
Assembly Constituencies which constitute this Parliamentary Constituency, after delimitation of Parliamentary Constituencies and Legislative Assembly Constituencies of 2008 are:

Members of Parliament
2019: Bhartruhari Mahtab, (Biju Janata Dal)
2014: Bhartruhari Mahtab, (Biju Janata Dal)
2009: Bhartruhari Mahtab, (Biju Janata Dal)
2004: Bhartruhari Mahtab, (Biju Janata Dal)
1999: Bhartruhari Mahtab, Biju Janata Dal
1998: Bhartruhari Mahtab, (Biju Janata Dal)
1995: Anadi Sahu, Indian National Congress
1991: Srikant Kumar Jena, Janata Dal
1989: Srikant Kumar Jena, (Janata Dal)
1985: Jayanti Patnaik, (Congress)
1980 (By Election): Jayanti Patnaik, (Congress)
1980: Janaki Ballabh Patnaik, (Congress)
1977: Sarat Kumar Kar, Janata Party
1971: Janaki Ballabh Patnaik, (Congress)
1967: Srinibas Mishra, Praja Socialist Party
1962: Nityanand Kanungo, (Congress)
1957: Nityanand Kanungo, (Congress)
1952: Birakisor Ray, (Congress)
1952: Harekrushna Mahtab, (Congress)

Election results

2019 Election Result
In 2019 election, Biju Janata Dal candidate Bhartuhari Mahatab defeated Bharatiya Janata Party candidate Prakash Mishra by a margin of 1,21,201 votes.

2014 Election Result
In 2014 election, Biju Janata Dal candidate Bhartuhari Mahatab defeated Indian National Congress candidate Aparajita Mohanty by a margin of 3,06,762 votes.

General Election 2009

Delimitation
There was a delimitation  exercise carried out in 2008 . Assembly Constituencies which constituted this Parliamentary Constituency, before delimitation of Parliamentary Constituencies and Legislative Assembly Constituencies of 2008 were:
 
 Salepur 
 Cuttack Sadar 
 Cuttack City 
 Tangi-Choudwar 
 Banki
 Athagarh 
 Baramba

See also
 Cuttack
 List of Constituencies of the Lok Sabha

References

Lok Sabha constituencies in Odisha
Politics of Cuttack district
Nayagarh district